Tobias Joachim Friden Andersson (born 7 May 1996) is a Swedish politician. He has been Member of the Riksdag since September 2018, representing the constituency of Västra Götaland County East for the Sweden Democrats party. 

Andersson graduated with a bachelor's degree in economics at the Gothenburg School of Business, Economics and Law in 2018. In 2014, at the age of 18, Andersson was elected to the Skövde municipal council for the Sweden Democrats, and then became group leader for the party in the municipality. At the time he was a member of the Sweden Democratic Youth (SDU). In 2015, he ran for chairman of the SDU against Jessica Ohlson and was seen as a more moderate candidate but narrowly lost the election. After the Sweden Democrats announced it was to break ties with the SDU due to repeated controversies, Andersson became the national spokesperson of the new Young Swedes SDU on 1 October 2015, and was the first person to hold the position.

In autumn 2021, he was appointed the Sweden Democrats' legal policy spokesperson and committee chairman in the justice committee in the Riksdag. In 2022, he was appointed chairman of the Committee on Industry and Trade in the Riksdag.

In August 2022, Anderrson received criticism from the leaderships of the Centre Party and Swedish Liberal Party leader Johan Pehrson after he Tweeted a picture of a Stockholm Metro train on which the SD had paid to feature a campaign advertisement with the caption "return-migration train. You have a one-way ticket. Next stop Kabul!” SD leader Jimmie Akesson denied Anderrson's comment was intended to be racist.

References 

Members of the Riksdag from the Sweden Democrats
1996 births
Living people
Members of the Riksdag 2018–2022
Members of the Riksdag 2022–2026
21st-century Swedish politicians